Somnath Sapru (born 21 January 1940) is a journalist, editor, media consultant and historian. His books deal primarily with the history of Indian aviation and armed services. The  positions he has occupied include editor of The Pioneer and resident editor of The Indian Express. He currently lives in Bangalore.

Sapru was born in the princely state of Kashmir (now the union territory of Jammu and Kashmir) in British India, and educated at Madras University.

Over his journalistic career, he has been employed as a defence correspondent with the Deccan Herald, a resident editor of The Indian Express in Madras, and as the editor of The Pioneer. In 1979, while editor of The Pioneer, he received a Jefferson Fellowship. In 1987, he received the Press Foundation of Asia-Mitsubishi Award for "Asian Journalist of the Year" (awaiting citation).

Since retirement, Sapru has written several books. Skyhawks, published in 2006, is about the four men who were the first Indians to fly military aircraft, while serving in the First World War. According to a reviewer, "many Indian aviation historians have generally given the topic a wide berth for it was really a time well before the growth of aviation in India and was even further removed from the beginnings of the Indian Air Force". The book is described as reflecting "an enormous amount of research ... (where) there was hardly any material or documentation available either in the IAF's archives or the Defence Ministry's records, as this narrative pertains to an era even before the Royal Air Force." Combat Lore: The Indian Air Force, 1930–1945 takes "the reader through the birth pangs of the Indian Air Force and provides a riveting account of its 'growing-up' years."

Bibliography 

 Transnational News Agencies & National Media Policies (Mysore University, 1979).
 The News Merchants: How They Sell News to the Third World (Dialogue Press, 1986).
 Pax Japanica: An Exposition Of Indo-Japan Relations (Batra Publications, New Delhi, 1990).
 Witness to the Century: Writings of C.S. Venkatachar, ICS (ed.)
 Lost Shangri-La (DK Printworld, 2001), about the antique past and cultural heritage of Kashmir. Decent Books. , 9788186921173.
 Skyhawks: India's Debut in Military Aviation (Writers' Workshop, Kolkata, 2007), a history of the first Indian pilots enrolled in the Royal Flying Corps during the First World War.  
 Armed Pegasus: The Early Years (Knowledge World Publishers, 2012), a history of the origins of established military aviation in India.
 Combat Lore: Indian Air Force 1930–1945 (Knowledge World Publishers, 2014), a history of the Indian Air Force during the Second World War.

References 

Living people
1940 births